Wojciech Szala (born January 27, 1976 in Piotrków Trybunalski) is a Polish footballer.

Career

GKS Katowice
Szala played in GKS Katowice between 1994 and 2001 for which he played in 93 matches and scored one goal. With GKS Katowice he won Polish Supercup in (1995).

Legia Warszawa
In summer 2001, he was recruited for Legia Warszawa by Dragomir Okuka. He made his debut in Ruch Chorzów - Legia Warszawa match (0:4). He played for ninety minutes. In this season he won the league with Legia, as well as the League Cup.

While Okuka was Legia's coach, Szala played as right midfielder from time to time. Next coach, Dariusz Kubicki, put him exclusively as a right defender.

The following temporary coach, Jacek Zieliński (from early 2005) moved Szala to the center defense. When Legia was taken over by Dariusz Wdowczyk, Szala returned to the right defense.

He was the first squad Legia player in seasons 2003/2004, 2004/2005 and 2005/2006 and has contributed to Legia being the least goal-conceding side in the league during that time.

GKS Katowice
In September 2010, he joined GKS Katowice. He was released one year later.

References

External links
 

1976 births
Living people
Legia Warsaw players
GKS Katowice players
Ekstraklasa players
Polish footballers
Sportspeople from Piotrków Trybunalski
Association football defenders